Ao Vivo (Live) is the first live album by Rui Veloso. It was released through EMI-Valentim de Carvalho in late 1988.

Recording
The album was recorded at Coliseu do Porto, in Porto, on 4 and 5 June 1987.

Track listing
Original edition (Double LP)

Disc 1Disc 2
CD edition

References

External links
Rui Veloso: Ao Vivo at Rate Your Music
Rui Veloso: Ao Vivo at moo.pt  

1986 live albums
Rui Veloso albums